Alex Majoli (born 1971) is an Italian photographer known for his documentation of war and conflict. He is a member of Magnum Photos. Majoli's work focuses on the human condition and the theater within our daily lives.

Life and work
Majoli was born in Ravenna, Italy.  He attended the Art Institute in Ravenna.

Majoli lived in New York City for 14 years, after which he moved to Sicily. He has been a member of Magnum Photos since 2001 and was its president from 2011 to 2014.

Awards
2002: Pesaresi Prize, Festival Foto
2003: Infinity Award for Photojournalism, the International Center of Photography
2004: Feature Photography Award, the Overseas Press Club
2004: Magazine Photographer of the Year, Best of Journalism Contest, National Press Photographers Association
2004: Honorable Mention, Oskar Barnack Award
2002/2004: Several citations at the Pictures of the Year International Award
2012: First prize, General News category (singles), World Press Photo, Amsterdam
2016: Guggenheim Fellowship from the John Simon Guggenheim Memorial Foundation, New York City

Exhibitions
Bambini, Palazzo Reale, Genova, Italy, 1998

Publications
Leros. Italy: West Zone, 1999. .
London: Trolley, 2003. .
One Vote. France: Filigranes, 2004.
Libera Me, Book I. London: Trolley, 2010. .
Congo. New York City: Aperture, 2015. Photographs by Majoli and Paolo Pellegrin. . With a text by Alain Mabanckou. Edition of 1500 copies (700 in French and 800 in English).
Scene. Paris: Le Bal; London: Mack, 2019.  (English edition);  (French edition). With essays by David Campany and Corinne Rondeau.

Collections
Majoli's work is held in the following permanent collection:
Snite Museum of Art, University of Notre Dame, South Bend, Indiana

References

External links
Magnum Photos biography
Personal website
Pocko blog interview with Majoli
Leica & Magnum - Portrait of Alex Majoli

Living people
Magnum photographers
1971 births
Italian photojournalists
People from Ravenna